Rubén Herráiz Alcaraz (born 13 January 1993), commonly known as Rufo, is a Spanish footballer who plays as a forward.

Club career
Born in Barcelona, Catalonia, Rufo finished his graduation with RCD Espanyol. In July 2012 he moved to Málaga CF, being assigned to the reserves in Tercera División.

On 31 July 2015, Rufo returned to the Pericos, signing a two-year contract with the B-side in Segunda División B, with Málaga holding a buy-back clause in the first year. He made his first team debut on 3 December 2015, coming on as a late substitute for Burgui in a 1–1 Copa del Rey away draw against Levante UD.

On 10 July 2017, free agent Rufo joined RCD Mallorca, freshly relegated to the third division.

On 14 August 2018 he signed an 18 month contract with Norwegian side Sandefjord.

Career statistics

Club

References

External links

1993 births
Living people
Footballers from Barcelona
Spanish footballers
Association football forwards
Segunda División B players
Tercera División players
Danish Superliga players
Atlético Malagueño players
RCD Espanyol B footballers
RCD Espanyol footballers
RCD Mallorca players
CF Badalona players
AaB Fodbold players
Spanish expatriate footballers
Expatriate footballers in Norway
Eliteserien players
Norwegian First Division players
Sandefjord Fotball players
Expatriate men's footballers in Denmark
Spanish expatriate sportspeople in Norway
Spanish expatriate sportspeople in Denmark